The Temple of Justice is a large building of modern style which was designed by Tommaso Valle in the 1960s on Capitol Hill in Monrovia, Liberia. Dedicated in 1965, it houses the Supreme Court of Liberia, auxiliary courtrooms, and legal offices. It suffered relatively little damage during the First and Second civil wars that lasted from 1989–2003, but poor maintenance and lack of electricity made the Temple unpleasant to work in.

A renovation project began in 2008; among its results was a change of the building's slogan to "LET JUSTICE BE DONE TO ALL" by removing the previous final word, "MEN".

References

Buildings and structures in Monrovia
Courthouses
1960s establishments in Liberia
Government buildings completed in 1965